Qarluq ( or) is an urban-type settlement in Surxondaryo Region, Uzbekistan. It is the administrative center of Oltinsoy District. Its population was 3,842 people in 1989, and 3,900 in 2016.

References

Populated places in Surxondaryo Region
Urban-type settlements in Uzbekistan